The Kangen River is a river in South Sudan, just west of Boma National Park. It joins the Pibor River near Pibor.

See also
 List of rivers of South Sudan

External links
Kangen River
sudan-map

Rivers of South Sudan
Jonglei State
Greater Upper Nile
Geography of Eastern Equatoria